Cincinnati Street Railway (CSR) was the public transit operator in Cincinnati, Ohio, from 1859 to 1952. The company ceased streetcar operations and was renamed Cincinnati Transit Company.

The company was founded in 1859 and was one of several operators. The Cincinnati Consolidated Railway merged with CSR in 1880:

 Passenger Railroad of Cincinnati 1859-1873 - merged with CCR
 Route Nine Street Railroad 1859-1873 - merged with CCR
 Pendleton Street Railroad 1860-1873 - merged with East and West Street Railroad Company and finally with CCR in 1873
 Cincinnati, Walnut Hills, Avondale and Pleasant Ridge Street Railway 1874-1880 - merged with CSR
 Storrs and Sedamsvill Street Railroad 1878-1880
 Cincinnati and Clifton Incline Plane Railroad 1876-1880
 Rees McDuffie 1884-1885
 Cumminsville Street Passenger Railroad ?-1889
 Walnut Hills and Cincinnati Street Railway 1872-1880
 Mount Adams and Eden Park Incline Railway 1876-1881
 Mount Auburn Cable Railway 1887-1896
 Mount Auburn Street Railway 1864-1873
 Cincinnati and Columbia Street Railway 1866-1896

Some of the city's streetcars, namely A9-10 PCC were sold to the Toronto Transit Commission upon abandonment.

The company began subway construction from 1920 to 1925, but the route was abandoned due to lack of money.

Fleet
 Streetcars built by the Cincinnati Car Company
 PCC streetcars built by the St. Louis Car Company
 Trolley buses built by several different manufacturers, but primarily Twin Coach, the St. Louis Car Company and Marmon-Herrington

Preserved vehicles
Some former CSR vehicles have been preserved in museums.  One example is car 2227, built in 1919 by the Cincinnati Car Company, at the Pennsylvania Trolley Museum.  That museum acquired car 2227 from the Lake Shore Electric Railway (another museum) in 2009 and restored it, unveiling the restored car in 2013.

See also
Streetcars in Cincinnati
Cincinnati Streetcar – new system under construction

References

 Early Street Railway 
 Cincinnati Subway
 Tom's North American Trolleybus Pix -- Cincinnati

Passenger rail transportation in Cincinnati
Defunct Ohio railroads
Interurban railways in Ohio
Streetcars in Ohio
Railway inclines in the United States
1859 establishments in Ohio
1952 disestablishments in Ohio